The 2019 Indian general election held in India between April and May 2019 to constitute the 17th Lok Sabha. The elections could be held at an earlier date if the Council of Ministers recommends dissolution of the 16th Lok Sabha to the President of India. However, the government has publicly announced that the elections will be held according to schedule.

Opinion polls

Candidates

Party wise results

Seat Share

Vote Share

Constituenties wise result

Assembly segments wise lead of Parties

See also
 2018 Assam panchayat election
 2021 Assam Legislative Assembly election

References

Indian general elections in Assam
2010s in Assam
Assam
2019 Indian general election
Elections in Assam